The 1931 College Football All-Southern Team consists of American football players selected to the College Football All-Southern Teams selected by various organizations for the 1931 Southern Conference football season. Tulane won the Southern Conference championship. In December 2008, Sports Illustrated undertook to identify the individuals who would have been awarded the Heisman Trophy in college football's early years, before the trophy was established.  Tulane's Jerry Dalrymple was selected as the would-be Heisman winner for the 1931 season.

Composite eleven
The All-Southern eleven compiled by the Associated Press included:
Johnny Cain, fullback for Alabama, All-American and later a coach. He was inducted into the College Football Hall of Fame in 1973.
Jerry Dalrymple, end for Tulane. One article which attempts to retroactively name Heisman Trophy winners before 1934 named Dalrymple as the recipient for 1931. He was elected to the College Football Hall of Fame as a player in 1954.
Austin Downes, quarterback and captain for Georgia.
Pete Gracey, center for Vanderbilt.
Herman Hickman, guard for Tennessee, All-American. He was inducted into the College Football Hall of Fame in 1959.
Tex Leyendecker, tackle for Vanderbilt, later played for the inaugural Philadelphia Eagles season.
Gene McEver, halfback for Tennessee, inducted into the College Football Hall of Fame in 1954.
John Scafide, guard for Tulane
Vernon "Catfish" Smith, end for Georgia, made an all-time Georgia Bulldogs football team picked in 1935. 
Ray Saunders, tackle for Tennessee, third-team All-American.
Don Zimmerman, halfback for Tulane. He threw a touchdown to Vernon Haynes in the Rose Bowl.

Composite overview
Overview of the Associated Press composite. "Votes" were tallied as 2 points for a first-team selection and 1 for a second-team selection.

All-Southerns of 1931

Ends
Jerry Dalrymple*, Tulane (College Football Hall of Fame) (AP-1, CP, TUL, CO, WA-1, SH)
Vernon "Catfish" Smith*, Georgia (College Football Hall of Fame) (AP-1, CP, CO, WA-1)
Vernon Haynes, Tulane (AP-2, TUL, WA-3, SH)
Ben Smith, Alabama (AP-2, WA-2)
George Koontz, SMU (WA-2)
Russell Grant, Auburn (WA-3)

Tackles
Tex Leyendecker, Vanderbilt (AP-1, CP, TUL, CO, WA-1, SH)
Ray Saunders, Tennessee (AP-1, CP, WA-2, SH)
Jay Dee Patton, Sewanee (AP-2, CO, WA-3)
Ralph Wright, Kentucky (AP-2)
Calvert "Foots" DeColigny, Tulane (TUL)
J. D. Bush, Auburn (WA-1)
Carl Moulden, Texas A&M (WA-2)
Marion Hammon, SMU (WA-3)

Guards
Herman Hickman, Tennessee (College Football Hall of Fame) (AP-1, CP, TUL, CO, WA-1, SH)
John Scafide, Tulane (AP-1, TUL, CO, WA-2)
Milton Leathers, Georgia (AP-2, CP)
Ralph Maddox, Georgia (AP-2, WA-1, SH)
Johnny Vaught, TCU (WA-2)
Jess Krajcovic, Maryland (WA-3)

Centers
Pete Gracey, Vanderbilt (AP-1, CP, CO, WA-3 [as g])
Winnie Lodrigues, Tulane (AP-2, WA-3)
Howard Neblett, Georgia Tech (WA-1)
Joe Sharp, Alabama (TUL, WA-2)
Jack Torrance, LSU (SH)

Quarterbacks
Austin Downes, Georgia (AP-1, CP, WA-2)
Lowell "Red" Dawson, Tulane (AP-2, TUL, CO, WA-1, SH)
Tommy Henderson, Vanderbilt (WA-3)

Halfbacks
Gene McEver, Tennessee (College Football Hall of Fame) (AP-1, CP, TUL, CO, WA-1, SH)
Don Zimmerman, Tulane (AP-1, CP, TUL, CO, WA-1, SH)
Shipwreck Kelly, Kentucky (AP-2, WA-2)
Jimmy Hitchcock, Auburn (College Football Hall of Fame) (AP-2, WA-3)
Dixie Roberts, Vanderbilt (WA-2)
Buster Mott, Georgia (WA-3)

Fullbacks
John Lewis Cain, Alabama (College Football Hall of Fame) (AP-1, TUL, CO, WA-1, SH)
Nollie Felts, Tulane (AP-2, CP, WA-2)
Ernie Koy, Texas (WA-3)

Key
Bold = Composite selection

* = Consensus All-American

AP = selected by coaches and sports writers, compiled by the Associated Press. It had a first and second team.

CP = selected by captains of the football team of the south, compiled by Central Press newspapers.

TUL = the "All Players All-Southern", selected by the players of the Tulane team.

CO = selected by the coaches of the Southern Conference.

WA = selected by William Alexander, coach at Georgia Institute of Technology. It had a first, second, and third team.

SH = selected by Clark Shaughnessy, coach at Tulane University.

References

1931 Southern Conference football season
College Football All-Southern Teams